Vice-Admiral James Hosken (6 December 1798 – 2 January 1885) was a British naval officer and a pioneer of ocean steam navigation. He returned to the Royal Navy to see service during the Crimean War.

Biography

Early naval career
Hosken was born on in Plymouth, the son of a navy warrant officer. He entered the Royal Navy on 23 February 1808, (two months after his 9th birthday). In 1810 he was appointed midshipman aboard , and later served in the Baltic, the Mediterranean, and the North Sea, until the end of the war in 1815. He passed the examination for lieutenant in 1816, but was unable to gain a commission. From 1816 to 1819 he served in the frigate  in the West Indies, then spent three years in the Channel serving aboard the brig . From 1824 to 1828 he served as Mate of the revenue cutter Scout, engaged in the suppression of smuggling. Finally, on 9 August 1828, he was appointed lieutenant of the bomb vessel , serving in the Mediterranean under Captain Stephen Lushington. He left the Navy in October 1832.

Merchant captain

Between 1833 and 1836 he was the captain of a merchant ship sailing between Liverpool and South America. In 1837 he devoted himself to the study of the marine steam engine, and towards the end of the year was appointed to the command of the Great Western Steamship Company's paddle-wheel steamship . She sailed from Bristol on her maiden voyage on 8 April 1838, and arrived at New York fifteen days later on the 23rd. This represented a dramatic increase in speed, as the average duration of an Atlantic crossing from England to America in a sailing ship was 34 days. Side paddle steamers had brought this down to 17 days, but with experience Hosken brought his average down to 13 days in the sixty-six voyages he made between England and America. In 1844 he was appointed to command of Great Western's , the first iron-hulled screw steamship and at that time the largest ship afloat. She sailed from Liverpool for New York on her maiden voyage in August 1845. However, on the night of 22 September 1846, during her fifth voyage, she ran aground in Dundrum Bay, Ireland. Weather conditions were poor, and an error on the chart led Hosken to believe that the lighthouse on St. John's Point, at the entrance of the bay, was the Calf of Man, which they had passed four hours before. After several months the ship was refloated, but Hosken had no further employment in the merchant service.

Later career
From 1848 to 1849 Hosken served as master attendant and postmaster at Labuan, recently ceded to England. He then returned to the navy and in 1851 he was appointed to command of the despatch vessel  in the Mediterranean, and later in the Channel. On 26 September 1853 he was promoted to commander, and during the Baltic campaigns of 1854–55 commanded the hospital ship . At the end of the Crimean War he was employed in bringing back troops from the Black Sea. In June 1857 he was promoted to captain, and in 1868 was placed on the retired list.

He was promoted to rear-admiral in April 1875, and vice-admiral in August 1879, and died at Ilfracombe, Devon, on 2 January 1885. He is buried in Arnos Vale Cemetery, Bristol.

In 1889 Elizabeth Ann, his second wife, published an Autobiographical Sketch of the Public Career of Admiral James Hosken.

A portrait of his son Thomas Hosken (b.1831) can be seen in Merchant Hall, Bristol.

Publications

See also

References

1798 births
1885 deaths
Royal Navy vice admirals
Royal Navy personnel of the Napoleonic Wars
Royal Navy personnel of the Crimean War
Steamship captains
British Merchant Navy officers
Burials in Gloucestershire
Military personnel from Plymouth, Devon